Verconia simplex is a species of colourful sea slug, a dorid nudibranch, a shell-less marine gastropod mollusk in the family Chromodorididae.

Distribution 
This marine species occurs in the tropical West Pacific and off Australia (Queensland).

Description
The length of the body varies between 5 mm and 14 mm.

Ecology

References

 Pease, W.H. 1871. Descriptions of new nudibranchiate Mollusca inhabiting Polynesia. American Journal of Conchology 7: 11-20
 Marshall, J.G. & Willan, R.C. 1999. Nudibranchs of Heron Island, Great Barrier Reef. Leiden : Backhuys 257 pp.
 Gosliner, T.M., Behrens, D.W. & Valdés, Á. (2008) Indo-Pacific Nudibranchs and seaslugs. A field guide to the world's most diverse fauna. Sea Challengers Natural History Books, Washington, 426 pp.

External links
 
 

Chromodorididae
Gastropods described in 1871